Isabella Robbiani (born 30 March 1992) is a former Paraguayan professional tennis player.

A right-handed player from Asunción, Robbiani played in five Fed Cup ties for Paraguay between 2010 and 2012. She represented Paraguay at the 2011 Pan American Games, where she made the second round of the singles.

As a professional player, Robbiani was ranked inside the world's top 500 for both singles and doubles. Her only title came in the doubles at Lima in 2012.

Robbiani, who is based in Florida, played college tennis for the Saint Leo University after leaving the tour in 2013.

ITF finals

Doubles: 5 (1–4)

References

External links
 
 
 

1992 births
Living people
Paraguayan female tennis players
Sportspeople from Asunción
Saint Leo University alumni
Pan American Games competitors for Paraguay
Tennis players at the 2011 Pan American Games
Competitors at the 2010 South American Games
21st-century Paraguayan women
20th-century Paraguayan women